The Vends were a Balto-Finnic people that lived between the 12th to 16th centuries in the area around the town of Wenden (now Cēsis) in present-day north-central Latvia.

According to Livonian Chronicle of Henry prior to their arrival in the area of Wenden in the 12th century, the Vends were settled in Ventava county<ref>Heinrici Chronicon Livoniae, X.14.: Wendi autem humiles erant eo tempore et pauperes utpote a Winda repulsi, qui est fluvius Curonie, et habitantes in Monte Antiquo, iuxta quem 1206.</ref> by the Venta River near the present city of Ventspils in western Latvia. Their proximity to more numerous Finnic and Baltic tribes inclined the Vends to ally with the German crusaders, who began building a stone castle near the older Vendian wooden fortress in 1207. The castle of Wenden later became the residence of the Master of the Livonian Order. The last known record of the Vends' existence as a distinct entity dates from the sixteenth century.

 Origin 
Henry of Latvia made the first surviving mention of the Vends as they were chased away from Courland and Christianized by Germans during Livonian Crusade of 1198–1290. Traditionally researchers believe that Vends spoke a Finnic language and were related to the neighboring Livonians and the Votes. Sometimes they are associated with the Western Slavic Wends.

 Flag of Latvia 
Vends may have a connection with the national flag of Latvia. The Rhyme Chronicle of Livonia (Livländische Reimchronik) states that in 1290 when the local militia was recruited to defend Riga, they came from Wenden with "a Latvian red banner crossed by white, in the manner of the Vends/of the Wenden" (nâch wendischen siten'').

See also 
Vistula Veneti
Wends

References

Historical ethnic groups of Europe
Ethnic groups in Latvia
Slavic tribes
Baltic Finns